Zhao Zhenkui was a Chinese diplomat who served as the first Chinese Ambassador to Angola.

References

Ambassadors of China to Angola
Possibly living people
Date of birth missing (living people)